Jutta Rantala (born 11 November 1999) is a Finnish footballer who plays as a forward for Vittsjö GIK in the Damallsvenskan and the Finland national team.

Club career 
Rantala debuted in the Finnish women's premier division Naisten Liiga at the age of 14. In 2019, she was the league top scorer with 22 goals and was nominated as the Player of the Year. In December 2019, Rantala was signed by the Swedish side Kristianstads DFF.

In December 2021, Rantala joined Vittsjö GIK.

International career
Rantala made her first national A-team appearance in the 2020 Cyprus Cup against Croatia.

International goals

Club honors 
Finnish Championship: 2019
Finnish Women's Cup: 2019

References

External links 
 
 
 Jutta Rantala at SPL 

1999 births
People from Köyliö
Living people
Women's association football forwards
Finnish women's footballers
Finnish expatriate footballers
Finnish expatriate sportspeople in Sweden
Expatriate women's footballers in Sweden
Finland women's international footballers
Kristianstads DFF players
Vittsjö GIK players
Damallsvenskan players
Kansallinen Liiga players
Sportspeople from Satakunta
UEFA Women's Euro 2022 players